Sunburst is an album by American jazz trumpeter Eddie Henderson recorded in 1975 and released on the Blue Note label.

Reception
The Allmusic review by Richard S. Ginell awarded the album 4 stars stating "Switching over to Blue Note, which was then reaping a fortune with Donald Byrd's R&B outfit, Eddie Henderson pursued a harder, earthier, more structured, funk-driven sound on his first album, while maintaining some of his marvelously spacier instincts for spice".

Track listing
All compositions by Eddie Henderson except as indicated
 "Explodition" (George Duke) - 6:41 
 "The Kumquat Kids" (Alphonso Johnson) - 4:30 
 "Sunburst" - 5:49 
 "Involuntary Bliss" (Alphonso Johnson) - 6:52 
 "Hop Scotch" (Harvey Mason) - 3:53 
 "Galaxy" - 6:36 
 "We End in a Dream" (Bennie Maupin) - 3:11 
Recorded at Wally Heider Sound Studios in San Francisco, California in April & May, 1975.

Personnel
Eddie Henderson - trumpet, flugelhorn, cornet
Julian Priester - trombone
Bennie Maupin - tenor saxophone, bass clarinet, saxello
Bobby Hutcherson - marimba (track 6)
George Duke - electric piano, clavinet, synthesizer
Buster Williams - bass (track 7)
Alphonso Johnson - electric bass (tracks 1-6)
Harvey Mason (tracks 1-6), Billy Hart (track 7) - drums

References 

1975 albums
Blue Note Records albums
Eddie Henderson (musician) albums
Albums recorded at Wally Heider Studios